DeWitt Clinton Littlejohn (February 7, 1818 – October 27, 1892) was a brevet brigadier general in the Union Army and a United States representative from New York during the Civil War.

Biography
Littlejohn initially pursued an academic course at Geneva Academy. Deciding to not complete college, he instead engaged in several profitable mercantile pursuits, acting for a time as a forwarder of fresh produce on the lakes and canals of the region. He later engaged in the manufacture of flour at Oswego, New York.

He was Mayor of Oswego, New York in 1849 and 1850. He was a member of the New York State Assembly (Oswego Co., 1st D.) in 1853, 1854, 1855, 1857, 1859, 1860, 1861, 1866, 1867, 1870, 1871 and 1884. He was speaker in 1855, 1857, 1859, 1860 and 1861; and was the chief lieutenant of political boss Thurlow Weed.

Early in 1861, Littlejohn was influential in the backroom politics to select Ira Harris over Horace Greeley as the Republican Party's nominee to run for the U.S. Senate to succeed William H. Seward, who had not run for re-election, expecting to join President Abraham Lincoln's Cabinet. In September, Littlejohn unsuccessfully sued Greeley and the New York Tribune for libel. With the outbreak of the Civil War in 1861, Littlejohn worked actively to recruit troops in the Oswego area.

Littlejohn used his political connections in July 1862 to secure a commission as Colonel of the 110th New York Volunteer Infantry, a regiment he helped raise through his personal efforts. He trained his troops at Camp Patterson near Baltimore, Maryland, where it was stationed until November, when it was ordered to Federal-occupied New Orleans, Louisiana.

Returning to politics, he successfully campaigned for the United States House of Representatives. He was elected as a Republican to the 38th United States Congress. He resigned from the army on February 3, 1863, and served in Congress from March 4, 1863, to March 3, 1865. During that term, he was Chairman of the Committee on Revolutionary Pensions. Littlejohn was not a candidate for renomination in 1864.

On February 26, 1867, President Andrew Johnson nominated Littlejohn for appointment to the grade of brevet brigadier general of volunteers, to rank from March 13, 1865, and the United States Senate confirmed the appointment on March 2, 1867.

He moved his residence to Buffalo, New York until 1867, when he moved back to Oswego. Littlejohn wanted to afford Oswego the growth possible by a rail connection to a major port. In 1868, he organized and served as president of the New York and Oswego Midland Railroad (NY&OM), a route traversing much of New York State on its way to New York City. He also established a steamboat service connecting Long Island to his new railroad.

In 1870 the Republican state convention nominated Littlejohn for Lieutenant Governor of New York on the ticket with Stewart L. Woodford, but he declined to run.

Fed up with the corruption of the Grant Administration, in 1872 Littlejohn joined the Liberal Republican Party and supported the candidacy of Horace Greeley for president in 1872, having set aside his previous legal issues with Greeley. He then became a Democrat, was a delegate to several Democratic state conventions, and was an ally of Samuel J. Tilden.

He died in Oswego, and was buried at the Riverside Cemetery.

See also

List of American Civil War brevet generals (Union)

References
 Retrieved on 2008-02-12
 Obit in NYT, October 28, 1892
 Brown, John Howard, ed., Lamb's Biographical Dictionary of the United States. Volume V. Boston: James H. Lamb Co., 1903.
 Eicher, John H., and David J. Eicher, Civil War High Commands. Stanford: Stanford University Press, 2001.

Notes

1818 births
1892 deaths
People from Oneida County, New York
Mayors of places in New York (state)
Speakers of the New York State Assembly
Republican Party members of the New York State Assembly
Union Army generals
People of New York (state) in the American Civil War
19th-century American railroad executives
New York (state) Liberal Republicans
New York (state) Democrats
Republican Party members of the United States House of Representatives from New York (state)
Politicians from Oswego, New York
19th-century American politicians